Soleyman District is a district (bakhsh) in Zaveh County, Razavi Khorasan Province, Iran. At the 2006 census, its population was 27,322, in 6,261 families.  The district has no cities. The district has one rural district (dehestan): Soleyman Rural District.

References 

Districts of Razavi Khorasan Province
Zaveh County